Richard Gary Peter Ellis (born 20 December 1960) is a former English cricketer.  Ellis was a right-handed batsman who bowled right-arm off break.  He was born at Paddington, London.

References

External links
Richard Ellis at ESPNcricinfo
Richard Ellis at CricketArchive

1960 births
Living people
People from Paddington
English cricketers
Oxford University cricketers
Middlesex cricketers
Gloucestershire cricketers
Hertfordshire cricketers
Oxford and Cambridge Universities cricketers
Alumni of St Edmund Hall, Oxford
British Universities cricketers